Augustin Goovaerts (1885 – August 15, 1939) was a Belgian architect and engineer, born in Schaerbeek, Brussels in 1885. Throughout his life, he designed a number of important urban architectural buildings, mainly in Colombia, where he worked as the department of Antioquia's official architect during the 1920s. Some of his works have been declared National Monuments in Colombia. He died at the age of 58 in Brussels due to leukemia caused by typhoid.

Biography

Augustin Goovaerts was born in Schaerbeek (Brussels) in 1885. He was the son of Celina and Alfonso Van Engelgeny (1847-1922), a leading intellectual in the European academic circles, as a librarian in Antwerp and later as a senior archivist of the Kingdom of Belgium. His father was also a polyglot, historian, musicologist, genealogist, editor.

From very young, Augustin Goovaerts began studying drawing at the Academy of Arts in Brussels, which he later completed in addition to architecture and engineering at the University of Leuven. Mandatory practices for students at Belgian universities allowed him to have direct contact with the work of Victor Horta, who was commissioned, the old Abbey of La Cambre, and the Dutchman Hendrik Berlage. He took up residence in Etterbeek, Brussels neighborhood where he began his architectural production, such as: the family home of Goovaerts, completed in 1907, and residences for families Desmet-Sillis and Desvaux-Berleur. He worked for a time in the office of the architect Edmond Serneels (1875-1934), who influenced the work of Goovaerts. There, he was responsible for the construction of the Church of Saint-Antoine, in Etterbeek, completed in 1910.

In 1914, he volunteered as a soldier at the beginning of the First World War. He was discharged from military service because of wounds suffered in combat. However, he continued as an active military organizer of a bilingual education network in Calais, the Belgian military barracks on the border with France. Before that, Goovaerts had taught drawing at the Belgian Military Institute of Vocational Rehabilitation. He served military service until 1918.

The initial period of his work in Medellin time between 1921 and 1924. During this period he created his largest projects, almost none of which is preserved, such as the Junín Theater, Cellular Jail La Ladera, and Ismael Correa Calpe, which hosted the mayor of Medellin in the twenties.

Style
When Goovaerts arrived in Colombia, he came with a lot of knowledge to implement. There was division between two stylistic tendencies: a very traditional, orthodox and academic type and an oriented position with the avant-garde, especially the art nouveau and modernism. The first was reflected more in public buildings and the second in his work for individuals.

Goovaerts was involved in the design and construction of more than 40 religious buildings.

Selected works
 National Palace, Colombia (1925)
 Rafael Uribe Uribe Palace of Culture, Colombia (1920-1930)
 Edificio Gonzalo Mejía, Medellín, Colombia (1922-1924) (Junín Theatre and Hotel Europa)
 Church of the Sacred Heart of Jesus, Colombia (1924-1939)
 College of Medicine, University of Antioquia
 Church of San José of El Poblado (1926)
 Monument in the San Pedro Cemetery Museum for Camilo Restrepo (1926)
 Chapel for the San Pedro Cemetery Museum (1925)

Gallery

References

Sources

 
 

 https://www.the-low-countries.com/article/augustin-goovaerts-a-belgian-palace-builder-in-colombia

1885 births
1939 deaths
Belgian architects
People from Schaerbeek
Deaths from leukemia
Deaths from typhoid fever
Deaths from cancer in Belgium
Catholic University of Leuven (1834–1968) alumni
Belgian expatriates in Colombia
Colombian architects